This article contains information about the literary events and publications of 1996.

Events
July 8 – Harper Lee's To Kill a Mockingbird, Mark Twain's Huckleberry Finn and 30 other books are struck from an English reading list in Lindale, Texas, as they "conflict with the values of the community."
July 11 – As requested by Nelson Mandela, Benjamin Zephaniah hosts the President's Two Nations Concert at London's Royal Albert Hall.
October 3 – The first performance is held in New York of Eve Ensler's episodic feminist play The Vagina Monologues.
unknown dates
In the UK, the first Orange Prize for Fiction for female novelists goes to Helen Dunmore for A Spell of Winter.
Peter O'Donnell publishes Cobra Trap, a final volume featuring Modesty Blaise. The first appeared in 1965.
Margaret Mitchell's lost first novella, Lost Laysen, is published, 80 years after it was written.
Lady Mary Wortley Montagu's Romance Writings, including her novel Princess Docile, are first published 234 years after her death.

New books

Fiction
Anonymous (Joe Klein) – Primary Colors: a novel of politics
Jeffrey Archer – The Fourth Estate
Margaret Atwood – Alias Grace
Beryl Bainbridge – Every Man for Himself
David Baldacci – Absolute Power
Iain M. Banks – Excession
David Bergen – A Year of Lesser
Thomas Berger – Suspects
Harold Bloom – Omens of Millennium: The Gnosis of Angels, Dreams, and Resurrection
Xurxo Borrazás – Eu é
Dionne Brand – In Another Place, Not Here
Brett Butler – Knee Deep in Paradise
Ann Chamberlin – Sofia; The Sultan's Daughter
Tom Clancy – Executive Orders
Mary Higgins Clark – Moonlight Becomes You
Joseph Connolly – This Is It
Bernard Cornwell – The Bloody Ground and Enemy of God
Douglas Coupland – Polaroids from the Dead
Amanda Craig – A Vicious Circle
Robert Crais – Sunset Express
John Darnton – Neanderthal
Donald Davidson – The Big Ballad Jamboree
Seamus Deane – Reading in the Dark
Stephen R. Donaldson – The Gap into Ruin: This Day All Gods Die
Ben Elton – Popcorn
Steve Erickson – Amnesiascope
Helen Fielding – Bridget Jones's Diary
Jon Fosse – Melancholy II (Melancholia II)
Neil Gaiman
The Sandman: The Kindly Ones (graphic novel; ninth in The Sandman series)
The Sandman: The Wake (graphic novel; tenth in The Sandman series)
Mavis Gallant – Selected Stories
John Gardner – Cold
Richard Garfinkle – Celestial Matters
Alex Garland – The Beach
William Golding – The Double Tongue
John Grisham – The Runaway Jury and Hackers (short stories)
James L. Halperin – The Truth Machine
Colin Harrison – Manhattan Nocturne
Elisabeth Harvor – Let Me Be the One (short stories)
Nancy Huston – The Goldberg Variations
Tama Janowitz – By the Shores of Gitchee Gumee
Matt Jones – Bad Therapy
Stephen King
Desperation
The Green Mile
The Regulators
Dean R. Koontz – Intensity
Michael P. Kube-McDowell – Before the Storm
Shield of Lies
Tyrant's Test
Caroline Lamarche – Le Jour du chien (The Day of the Dog)
Hugh Laurie – The Gun Seller
John le Carré – The Tailor of Panama
Paul Leonard – Speed of Flight
Steve Lyons – Killing Ground
George R. R. Martin – A Game of Thrones
David A. McIntee – The Shadow of Weng-Chiang
Terry McMillan – How Stella Got Her Groove Back
Javier Marías – When I Was Mortal (Cuando fui mortal, short stories)
Vladimir Megre – Anastasiya
Lawrence Miles – Christmas on a Rational Planet
Rohinton Mistry – A Fine Balance
Shani Mootoo – Cereus Blooms at Night
Joyce Carol Oates – We Were the Mulvaneys
Daniel O'Mahony – The Man in the Velvet Mask
Kate Orman – Return of the Living Dad and Sleepy
Chuck Palahniuk – Fight Club
Lance Parkin – Cold Fusion and Just War
Marc Platt – Downtime
Terry Pratchett – Feet of Clay and Hogfather
Qiu Miaojin (posthumous) – Last Words from Montmartre
James Redfield – The Tenth Insight
Justin Richards – The Sands of Time
Gareth Roberts
The English Way of Death
The Plotters
Mary Rosenblum – Synthesis & Other Virtual Realities
Kristine Kathryn Rusch – The New Rebellion
Gary Russell – The Scales of Injustice
Jeff Shaara – Gods and Generals
Michael Slade – Zombie and Evil Eye
Michael Stackpole
The Krytos Trap
Rogue Squadron
Wedge's Gamble
Dave Stone – Death and Diplomacy
Graham Swift – Last Orders
Guy Vanderhaeghe – The Englishman's Boy
David Foster Wallace – Infinite Jest
Monika Maron – Animal Triste

Children and young people
K.A. Applegate - Animorphs series
Marion Zimmer Bradley (with Rosemary Edghill) – Witchlight
James C. Christensen (with Renwick St. James and Alan Dean Foster) – Voyage of the Basset
Anne Fine – The Tulip Touch
Elaine Forrestal – Someone Like Me
Mem Fox – Boo to a Goose
Jeri Freedman (with J. F. Rivkin) – Season of Storms
Rumer Godden
The Little Chair
Premlata and the Festival of Lights
Cockcrow to Starlight: A Day Full of Poetry (anthology)
Mark Helprin (with Chris Van Allsburg) – A City in Winter
E. T. A. Hoffmann (with Roberto Innocenti) – The Nutcracker
Lyll Becerra de Jenkins - So Loud a Silence
Julius Lester – Sam and the Tigers: A New Telling of Little Black Sambo
Anne McCaffrey – No One Noticed the Cat
Michael Morpurgo – The Butterfly Lion
Jim Murphy – A YOUNG PATRIOT: The American Revolution as Experienced by One Boy
Andre Norton (with Martin H. Greenberg and Mark Hess) – Catfantastic IV
Joyce Carol Oates (with Barry Moser) – First Love: A Gothic Tale
Iona Opie – My Very First Mother Goose
Philip Pullman – The Subtle Knife (second in His Dark Materials trilogy)
Alan Schroeder – Minty: A Story of Young Harriet Tubman
Diane Stanley – Leonardo da Vinci
Jean Ure - Skinny Melon and Me

Drama
Jeff Baron – Visiting Mr. Green
Nick Enright – Blackrock
Eve Ensler – The Vagina Monologues
Pam Gems – Stanley
Jenny Kemp – The Black Sequin Dress
Ayub Khan-Din – East is East
Martin McDonagh – The Beauty Queen of Leenane
Mark Ravenhill – Shopping and Fucking
Wallace Shawn – The Designated Mourner
Joshua Sobol – Alma
Shelagh Stephenson – The Memory of Water
Botho Strauß – Ithaka
Enda Walsh – Disco Pigs
Peter Whelan – The Herbal Bed
Roy Williams – The No Boys Cricket Club

Poetry

Non-fiction
Nelson Algren (posthumous) – Nonconformity (essay, written 1953)
Plinio Apuleyo Mendoza, Carlos Alberto Montaner and  Álvaro Vargas Llosa – Guide to the Perfect Latin American Idiot (essay)
Stephen Ambrose – Undaunted Courage
Bruce Bawer (editor) – Beyond Queer
John Berendt – Midnight in the Garden of Good and Evil
David Chalmers – The Conscious Mind: In Search of a Fundamental Theory
Norman Davies – Europe: A History
Richard Dawkins – Climbing Mount Improbable
Antonia Fraser – The Gunpowder Plot: Terror and Faith in 1605
Daniel Goleman – Emotional Intelligence
Denis Guedj – Numbers: The Universal Language
Jennifer Hanson – The Real Freshman Handbook
Samuel P. Huntington – The Clash of Civilizations and the Remaking of World Order
Richard Mabey – Flora Britannica
Howard Marks – Mr Nice
Dylan Morgan – The Principles of Hypnotherapy
Anne Mullens – Timely Death
Denise Schmandt-Besserat – How Writing Came About
Arun Shourie – Missionaries in India
Alexander Skutch – The Minds of Birds
Alessandro Vezzosi – Leonardo da Vinci: The Mind of the Renaissance

Births
December 25 - Elvira Natali, Indonesian author and actress
November 13 - Zeki Majed,  Kurdish filmmaker and poet

Deaths
January 5 – Lincoln Kirstein, American writer and impresario (born 1907)
January 8 – Howard Taubman, American author and critic (born 1907)
January 11 – Harold Walter Bailey, English linguistics scholar (born 1899)
January 16 – Kaye Webb, English publisher and journalist (born 1914)
January 21 – Efua Sutherland, Ghanaian dramatist, poet and children's author (born 1924)
January 27 – Barbara Skelton, English fiction writer, memoirist and literary figure (born 1916)
January 28
Jerry Siegel, American cartoonist (born 1914)
Joseph Brodsky, Russian-born poet and essayist, Nobel Prize laureate (myocardial infarction, born 1940)
February 11
Bob Shaw, Northern Irish science fiction writer (born 1931)
Amelia Rosselli, Italian poet (born 1930)
February 12 – Ryōtarō Shiba, Japanese novelist (born 1923)
February 18 – Cathal Ó Sándair, Irish-language novelist (born 1922)
March 3 
 Marguerite Duras, French dramatist and film director (born 1914)
 Léo Malet, French crime novelist and surrealist (born 1909)
March 15 – Wolfgang Koeppen, German novelist (born 1906)
March 18
Jacquetta Hawkes (née Hopkins), English writer and archeologist (born 1910)
Odysseas Elytis, Greek writer and Nobel Prize laureate (born 1911)
March 22 
 Claude Mauriac, French novelist and journalist (born 1914)
 Ian Stephens, Canadian poet (year of birth not known)
March 29 – Frank Daniel, Czech-born screenwriter, director, and teacher (born 1926)
March 31 – Dario Bellezza, Italian poet and dramatist (HIV, born 1944)
April 16 – Leila Mackinlay, British romantic novelist (born 1910)
April 18 – Kalim Siddiqui, Pakistani-born English writer and Islamic activist (born 1931)
April 20 – Christopher Robin Milne, English writer and bookseller (born 1920)
April 22 – Erma Bombeck, American humorist and writer (born 1927)
April 23 – P. L. Travers, Australian-born children's writer (born 1899)
May 2 – Emile Habibi, Palestinian Israeli writer and politician (born 1922)
May 8 – Larry Levis, American poet, author, and critic (born 1946)
May 24 – Joseph Mitchell, American journalist (born 1908)
May 26
Ovidiu Papadima, Romanian critic and essayist (born 1909)
Margaret Douglas-Home, English writer and musician (born 1906)
May 31 – Timothy Leary, American writer (born 1920)
June 2 – Leon Garfield, English children's author (born 1921)
June 14 – Gesualdo Bufalino, Italian novelist (born 1920)
June 15 – Fitzroy Maclean, Scottish political writer, autobiographer and diplomat (born 1911)
July 10 – Eno Raud, Estonian children's author (born 1928)
July 22 – Jessica Mitford, Anglo-American author, journalist and campaigner (born 1917)
September 21 – Henri Nouwen, Dutch priest, theologian and author (born 1932)
September 29 – Shusaku Endo (遠藤周作), Japanese novelist (born 1923)
October 16 – Eric Malpass, English novelist (born 1910)
October 24 – Sorley Maclean, Gaelic poet (born 1911)
November 27 – Lili Berger, Yiddish writer, antifascist militant and literary critic (born 1916)
December 7 – José Donoso, Chilean writer (born 1924)
December 9 – Diana Morgan, Welsh playwright and screenwriter (born 1908)
December 12 – Vance Packard, American journalist and social critic (born 1914)
December 16 – Quentin Bell, English biographer and art historian (born 1910)
December 20 – Carl Sagan, American astronomer, astrophysicist and writer (born 1934)
December 21 – Margret Rey, American author and illustrator (born 1906)

Awards
Nobel Prize for Literature: Wislawa Szymborska
Camões Prize: Eduardo Lourenço

Australia
The Australian/Vogel Literary Award: Bernard Cohen, The Blindman's Hat
C. J. Dennis Prize for Poetry: Peter Bakowski, In the Human Night
Kenneth Slessor Prize for Poetry: Eric Beach, Weeping for Lost Babylon
Mary Gilmore Prize: Jordie Albiston, Nervous Arcs
Miles Franklin Award: Christopher Koch, Highways to a War

Canada
Bronwen Wallace Memorial Award
Giller Prize for Canadian Fiction: Margaret Atwood: – Alias Grace
See 1996 Governor General's Awards for a complete list of winners and finalists for those awards.
Edna Staebler Award for Creative Non-Fiction: George G. Blackburn, The Guns of Normandy

United Kingdom
Booker Prize: Graham Swift, Last Orders
Carnegie Medal for children's literature: Melvin Burgess, Junk
James Tait Black Memorial Prize for fiction: Graham Swift, Last Orders, and Alice Thompson, Justine
James Tait Black Memorial Prize for biography: Diarmaid MacCulloch, Thomas Cranmer: A Life
Cholmondeley Award: Elizabeth Bartlett, Dorothy Nimmo, Peter Scupham, Iain Crichton Smith
Eric Gregory Award: Sue Butler, Cathy Cullis, Jane Griffiths, Jane Holland, Chris Jones, Sinéad Morrissey, Kate Thomas
Orange Prize for Fiction: Helen Dunmore, A Spell of Winter
Queen's Gold Medal for Poetry: Peter Redgrove
Whitbread Best Book Award: Seamus Heaney, The Spirit Level

United States
Agnes Lynch Starrett Poetry Prize: Helen Conkling, Red Peony Night
Bernard F. Connors Prize for Poetry: John Voiklis, "The Princeling's Apology", and (separately) Sarah Arvio, "Visits from the Seventh"
Bobbitt National Prize for Poetry: Kenneth Koch, One Train
Compton Crook Award: Daniel Graham Jr., The Gatekeepers
Hugo Award: Neal Stephenson, The Diamond Age, or A Young Lady's Illustrated Primer
National Book Award: Andrea Barrett, Ship Fever and Other Stories
National Book Critics Circle Award: for Fiction Gina Berriault, Women in Their Beds
National Book Critics Circle Award: for Poetry William Matthews, Time and Money
National Book Critics Circle Award: for General nonfiction Jonathan Harr, A Civil Action
National Book Critics Circle Award: for Biography Robert Polito, Savage Art: A Biography of Jim Thompson
Nebula Award: Nicola Griffith, Slow River
Newbery Medal for children's literature: Karen Cushman, The Midwife's Apprentice
PEN/Faulkner Award for Fiction: Richard Ford, Independence Day
Pulitzer Prize for Drama: Jonathan Larson, Rent
Pulitzer Prize for Fiction: Richard Ford – Independence Day
Pulitzer Prize for Poetry: Jorie Graham: The Dream of the Unified Field
Wallace Stevens Award: Adrienne Rich
Whiting Awards: Fiction: Anderson Ferrell, Cristina García, Molly Gloss, Brian Kiteley, Chris Offutt (fiction/nonfiction), Judy Troy, A.J. Verdelle. Nonfiction: Patricia Storace (nonfiction/poetry). Poetry: Brigit Pegeen Kelly, Elizabeth Spires

Elsewhere
International Dublin Literary Award: David Malouf, Remembering Babylon
Premio Nadal: Pedro Maestre, Matando dinosaurios con tirachinas

References

 
Years of the 20th century in literature